The surname Brost derives from the Middle High German brobest, meaning supervisor. Notable people with the surname include:

 Erich Brost (1903–1995), German journalist and publisher
 Gudrun Brost (1910–1993), Swedish actress
 Johannes Brost (1946–2018), Swedish actor
 Lambert Brost (1835–1909), American member of the Wisconsin State Assembly
 Todd Brost (born 1967), Canadian ice hockey player and coach

References